Bop City (also known as Jimbo's Bop City) was a jazz club operated by John "Jimbo" Edwards in San Francisco from 1949 to 1965. It was situated in the back room of a Victorian house at 1690 Post Street, in the Western Addition district. During its heyday, the venue was known for late-night live performances of many popular jazz artists, including Billie Holiday, Louis Armstrong, Chet Baker, and Charlie Parker, and was one of the most famous jazz clubs of its time, being instrumental in popularizing the modern jazz style in San Francisco.

The club closed in 1965 when jazz began to decline in popularity. The house was moved two blocks west to 1712 Fillmore Street during the urban renewal in the Western Addition in the 1970s, where it currently stands, and has been designated a San Francisco Designated Landmark.

History
The Bop City jazz club was one of the best-known jazz venues in San Francisco in the 1950s. It was located at 1690 Post Street in the Fillmore/Western Addition district between Laguna Street and Buchanan Street. The district was previously a Japanese American enclave, but became a heavily African-American neighborhood after the internment of Japanese Americans during World War II.

While modern jazz, whether in the form of swing or bebop, was popular on Los Angeles' Central Avenue, San Francisco was at the time a haven of traditional jazz (also known as Dixieland). In the 1940s and early 1950s, the Bay Area scene was dominated by Dixieland revival bands such as Lu Watters' Yerba Buena Jazz Band. In the late 1940s, however, new clubs emerged in the Tenderloin and North Beach districts, which changed the music scene in the city.

Bop City emerged from the short-lived club Vout City, run by Slim Gaillard on the same premises. Gaillard moved to Los Angeles, leaving the venue to Charles Sullivan, an African-American entrepreneur. Sullivan acquired the building and rented it to John "Jimbo" Edwards (1913–2000), who initially only wanted to open a cafe called Jimbo's Waffle Shop. At the insistence of musicians, Edwards created a function room with a stage in a larger back room.

The San Francisco club opened in late March 1949, with a concert by the Dizzy Gillespie Orchestra and Sarah Vaughan. Bop City was best known for its nocturnal jam sessions and parties, as the club only opened at 2:00 am and stayed open until 6:00 am, when all other restaurants and clubs were closed.

Pony Poindexter described the scene:

Artists who played at Bop City include: Duke Ellington, Ben Webster, Billy Eckstine, Miles Davis, Count Basie, Billie Holiday, Dinah Washington, John Coltrane (in October 1950) and Dewey Redman. The saxophonist John Handy, who later played with Charles Mingus, began here his career as a house musician and jammed with Benny Bailey, Kenny Dorham, and Paul Gonsalves. Other house musicians were the bassists Terry Hilliard and Teddy Edwards. The first musicians to play at Bop City included Jimmy Heath, Milt Jackson, Roy Porter, Sonny Criss, and Hampton Hawes.

Bop City was the site of the only meeting between Louis Armstrong and Charlie Parker. The trumpeter had come to the club after a concert of his own, to find that Parker was playing. The club's clientele also included the young Clint Eastwood as well as celebrities and Hollywood stars such as Joe Louis, Marilyn Monroe, Kim Novak, and Sammy Davis Jr.

The club also attracted writers such as Jack Kerouac, and artists. The painter and film maker Harry Everett Smith painted the walls with abstract motifs and created a light show that ran to the music of Dizzy Gillespie and Thelonious Monk. Admission was only $1, and musicians came in for free, but Jimbo Edwards always chose who he let in and who he did not:

The singer Mary Stallings commented on the atmosphere from the African-American perspective:

Closure

In 1965 Jimbo Edwards had to close the club, shortly after other well-known jazz clubs like the Black Hawk and Say When had ceased their activities due to falling interest.

As part of the urban renewal work in the district during the mid-1970s, the Victorian house that housed Jimbo's Waffle Shop was moved two blocks west to 1712 Fillmore Street. However, the back room where Bop City was located fell victim to the demolition. The house was occupied by Marcus Books, the oldest African-American bookseller in the US, from 1980 to 2014.

Carol P. Chamberland filmed the 1998 documentary The Legend of Bop City, about the club, starring Dick Berk, Jimbo Edwards, and Teddy Edwards. John "Jimbo" Edwards died in April 2000 at the age of 87.

On February 13, 2014, the city of San Francisco designated the house at 1712 Fillmore Street as a San Francisco Designated Landmark, for being the site of both Bop City and Marcus Books.

References

Sources

External links 

 Robert Tate & Nina J. Hodgson: Jimbo Edwards at Bop City
 Carol P. Chamberland: The House That Bop Built
 Memories of Bop City by Si Perkoff

Former music venues in California
History of San Francisco
Defunct jazz clubs in California
Music venues completed in 1949
Jazz clubs in the San Francisco Bay Area
Bob 
1949 establishments in California
1965 disestablishments in California